Roman Wójcicki (born 8 January 1958) is a Polish former football player and manager. He played as a defender for clubs including Odra Opole, Śląsk Wrocław, Widzew Łódź, FC Homburg (West Germany) and Hannover 96 (West Germany).

Playing career
Wójcicki was born in Nysa. He played for the Poland national team, making 62 appearances and scoring two goals. He was a participant at the three consecutive World Cups, 1978 FIFA World Cup, 1982 FIFA World Cup, where Poland won the bronze medal and 1986 FIFA World Cup.

He ended his career as a player-manager for TSV Havelse, before coaching various amateur and youth teams in the Hanover Region.

Honours
Poland

 FIFA World Cup Bronze Medal: 1982
 Nehru Cup: 1984

References

1958 births
Living people
People from Nysa, Poland
Sportspeople from Opole Voivodeship
Polish footballers
Association football defenders
Poland international footballers
1978 FIFA World Cup players
1982 FIFA World Cup players
1986 FIFA World Cup players
Bundesliga players
Ekstraklasa players
Odra Opole players
Śląsk Wrocław players
Widzew Łódź players
FC 08 Homburg players
Hannover 96 players
TSV Havelse players
Polish football managers
TSV Havelse managers
Polish expatriate footballers
Polish expatriate football managers
Polish expatriate sportspeople in Germany
Expatriate footballers in Germany
Expatriate football managers in Germany
Polish expatriate sportspeople in West Germany
Expatriate footballers in West Germany